Koufie is a surname. Notable people with the surname include:

Ben Koufie (1932–2016), Ghanaian footballer, manager and administrator
Ransford Koufie (born 2002), Ghanaian footballer

Ghanaian surnames